Darren Leigh Treumer (23 November 1971) is a former Australian cricketer.  Treumer was a right-handed batsman who played as a wicket-keeper.

After over a decade of representing Northern Territories in Australia, Treumer played a single List A match as an overseas player for Denmark in the 1st round of the 2005 Cheltenham & Gloucester Trophy against Northamptonshire. In his only List A appearance, he scored 7 runs before being dismissed by Charl Pietersen.  Behind the stumps he took 2 catches.

References

External links
Darren Treumer at ESPNcricinfo
Darren Treumer at CricketArchive

1971 births
Living people
Australian cricketers
Denmark cricketers
Wicket-keepers